The Deadly Dozen: India's Most Notorious Serial Killers is the 2019 debut true-crime non-fiction novel by Anirban Bhattacharyya the Indian author, standup comedian, actor, producer, writer and co-creator of the TV show Savdhaan India. The book became the No.1 Bestseller on Amazon India. The book was launched by film director Anurag Kashyap in Mumbai.

Plot
The book is a true-crime book that features the true-life stories and cases of 12 serial killers from India. The killers who are featured in the book includeKD Kempamma aka Cyanide Mallika, Gowri Shankar aka Auto Shankar, Moninder Singh Pandher and Surinder Koli, the Joshi-Abhyankar serial murders, Mohan Kumar aka Cyanide Mohan, Thug Behram, Darbara Singh, Amardeep Sada, Raman Raghav and the case of Seema Gavit and Renuka Shinde

The book also contains the unsolved cases of Beerman and Stoneman.
Amongst these killers Thug Behram is known as the world's most prolific serial killer with over 931 kills. While, Amardeep Sada is the world's youngest serial killer at the age of 7.

Reviews
Anurag Kashyap described the book as "I have always said, reality is stranger than fiction; these true accounts are gut-wrenching and make us question our surroundings"
Bollywood actor and singer Ayushmann Khurrana called the book "One of the most exciting true crime books I have read in recent years. Highly engaging. The stories grip you by the jugular. Razor-sharp and gripping". 
Bollywood action star John Abraham described it as "An extremely gritty, taut and suspenseful thriller. Anirban's writing transports you to the actual scene of crime. Strongly recommended!"
Television and movie actor Ronit Roy described it as "a gripping, thrilling piece of work."
Film director Kiran Rao found the book a" twisted and macabre world of serial killers." 
Author and actor Jayant Kripalani praised the book because "Each story has a mind of its own and twisting each one in a fascinating way is Anirban Bhattacharyya's own intriguing mind".
Film director Shashanka Ghosh who directed the movie Veere Di Wedding said, "AB [Anirban Bhattacharyya] has written a supremely unputdownable book. I can imagine the kind of research that's gone into this book. And while the stories are real, AB's retelling is crisp and captures the drama of the moments superbly. Excellent read!"
The book also received positive reviews and praise from the press.
 Radhika Dutt of The Millennium Post wrote "Anirban Bhattacharyya's The Deadly Dozen will send shivers and also permeate a sense of peace for these 12 no longer haunt the streets of your apparently safe city".
 The "Mid-Day" review stated: "Appearing straight-faced when talking about the gruesomeness of crime and criminals comes naturally to someone who has engaged with the subject for a while".
 "With profiles of 12 of the most famous serial killers of India, this book sets out to debunk the notion that serial killers are a Western phenomenon. The author has tried to get into the heads of the murderers to explore what made them kill"— Pune Mirror The Times of India 20 Sept 2020  
"In this bone-chilling collection of stories, Anirban Bhattacharyya explores what made India's most devious murderers kill and why". Reader's Digest
"Delve into true stories of some of India's most heinous serial killers"— New Indian Express

References

2019 Indian novels
Non-fiction crime books